Ignacio "Iñaki" Vicente Barredo (1955 – 9 January 2020) was a Filipino football player who played for the Philippines national football team.

Education
Vicente attended La Salle Green Hills for his elementary and high school education. He finished his basic education in 1972 and entered De La Salle University, where he graduated in 1977 with a bachelor's degree in business administration.

Career
An active collegiate player in the 1970s, Vicente played for the senior football team of the De La Salle University from 1973 to 1976. He also played for the junior football team of La Salle Green Hills as a high school student from 1968 to 1972.

In the club level, Vicente has played for San Miguel Corporation's football team, helping the team in making its runner-up finish in the 1977 Lobregat Cup. He also played for other teams such as Pepsi Cola, PTGWO, Tancho, Tigers, and the football team of the Manila Jockey Club.

Vicente was a player for the Philippines senior national team from 1973 to 1989, taking part in the Asian qualifiers for the 1972 Summer Olympics in 1971, and in the Asian qualifiers for the 1976 Summer Olympics in 1973. He was also part of the squad that played in the 1974 Asian Games and also represented the Philippines in the AFC Youth Championship in 1971, 1972, and 1974.

Personal life
Iñaki Vicente was married to Honeylet Montenegro who is the daughter of the celebrated Philippine film actor Mario Montenegro. His father Ignacio Sr., played for the national team in Interport tournaments in Hong Kong while his brothers also played for De La Salle. His daughter, Valeen Montenegro is an actress and model.

Later life and death
Vicente served as the general manager of the Kaya Football Academy in his later years. He suffered from a stroke in October 2019 and died on January 9, 2020, at age 65.

References

1955 births
2020 deaths
Deaths from cerebrovascular disease
De La Salle University alumni
Philippines international footballers
Footballers at the 1974 Asian Games
Asian Games competitors for the Philippines
Filipino people of Spanish descent
Filipino footballers
Neurological disease deaths in the Philippines
Association footballers not categorized by position